National Route 129 (N129) or simply Route 129 is a secondary national route in Metro Manila that forms part of the Philippine highway network. Entirely located within Quezon City, it comprises Congressional Avenue, Congressional Avenue Extension, portion of Luzon Avenue, portion of Tandang Sora Avenue, and portion of Katipunan Avenue; most of them are part of C-5 with the exception of EDSA–Mindanao Avenue segment.

References

Streets in Quezon City